CMC Music Awards was an Australian music awards ceremony held annually from 2011 to 2018. They were provided by the Country Music Channel (CMC), which is owned by Foxtel, and were determined by fan votes. From 2015 the ceremonies were staged in the Brisbane to Gold Coast region. Since 2016 there were three international categories, where Australians residing abroad are acknowledged.

Categories

Oz Artist of the Year
Australian Artist of the Year (male)
Australian Artist of the Year (female)
New Australian Artist of the Year
Video of the Year
International Artist of the Year
International Video of the Year
ARIA Highest-selling Album of the Year
Group/Duo of the Year
ARIA Highest-selling International Album of the Year
CMC Hall of Fame

Not all categories were used in each year.

Ceremonies 

From 2007 to 2010, CMC awarded only one category, Oz Artist of the Year; Adam Brand won the trophy four years in a row. In March 2011 the ceremony was expanded to four awards – all fan voted.

2011: 1st CMC Music Awards 

The first ceremony was held at the Hope Estate Winery, Hunter Valley, on 4 March 2011.

|-
|rowspan="4"| 2011 || Adam Brand || Oz Artist of the Year || 
|-
|   | McAlister Kemp || New Australian Artist of the Year || 
|-
|   | Keith Urban – "'Til Summer Comes Around" || Video of the Year || 
|-
|   | Taylor Swift || International Artist of the Year ||

2012: 2nd CMC Music Awards 

The second ceremony was held at the Hope Estate Winery, Hunter Valley on 16 March 2012 with Jay and Mark O'Shea hosting.

|-
|rowspan="5"| 2012 || Jasmine Rae || Oz Artist of the Year || 
|-
|   | Peter McWhirter || New Australian Artist of the Year || 
|-
|   | Keith Urban – "Without You" || Video of the Year || 
|-
|   | Keith Urban || International Artist of the Year || 
|-
|   | James Blundell || CMC Hall of Fame ||

2013: 3rd CMC Music Awards 

The third ceremony was held at the Hope Estate Winery, Hunter Valley on 15 March 2013.

|-
|rowspan="5"| 2013 || The McClymonts || Oz Artist of the Year || 
|-
|   | Morgan Evans || New Australian Artist of the Year || 
|-
|   | McAlister Kemp – "Country Proud" || Video of the Year || 
|-
|   | Keith Urban || International Artist of the Year || 
|-
|   | Keith Urban – "For You" || International Video of the Year ||

2014: 4th CMC Music Awards 

The fourth ceremony was held at the Hope Estate Winery, Hunter Valley on 14 March 2014 with the McClymonts hosting.

|-
|rowspan="7"| 2014 || Morgan Evans || Oz Artist of the Year || 
|-
|   | Morgan Evans || Australian Artist of the Year (male) || 
|-
|   | Jasmine Rae || Australian Artist of the Year (female) || 
|-
|   | The Wolfe Brothers || New Australian Artist of the Year || 
|-
|   | Morgan Evans – "Carry On" || Video of the Year || 
|-
|   | Taylor Swift || International Artist of the Year || 
|-
|   |  Tim Mcgraw and Taylor Swift (featuring Keith Urban on guitar) – "Highway Don't Care" || International Video of the Year ||

2015: 5th CMC Music Awards 

The fifth ceremony was held at Brisbane's QPAC on 12 March 2015 with Morgan Evans hosting.

|-
|rowspan="8"| 2015 || Adam Brand || Oz Artist of the Year || 
|-
|   | Morgan Evans || Australian Artist of the Year (male) || 
|-
|   | Amber Lawrence || Australian Artist of the Year (female) || 
|-
|   | Christie Lamb || New Australian Artist of the Year || 
|-
|   | Adam Brand – "What Your Love Looks Like" || Video of the Year || 
|-
|   | Keith Urban || International Artist of the Year || 
|-
|   | Keith Urban – "Cop Car" || International Video of the Year || 
|-
|   | The McClymonts || Group/Duo of the Year ||

2016: 6th CMC Music Awards 

The sixth ceremony was held at Brisbane's QPAC on 10 March 2016 with Morgan Evans and Kelsea Ballerini hosting.

|-
|rowspan="10"| 2016 || Adam Brand || Oz Artist of the Year || 
|-
|   | Lee Kernaghan || Australian Artist of the Year (male) || 
|-
|   | Amber Lawrence || Australian Artist of the Year (female) || 
|-
|   | Caitlyn Shadbolt || New Australian Artist of the Year || 
|-
|   | Lee Kernaghan – "Spirit of the ANZACs" || Video of the Year || 
|-
|   | Keith Urban || International Artist of the Year || 
|-
|   | Keith Urban – "Raise 'Em Up" (featuring Eric Church) || International Video of the Year || 
|-
|   | Lee Kernaghan – Spirit of the ANZACs || ARIA Highest Selling Album || 
|-
|   | The Wolfe Brothers || Group/Duo of the Year || 
|-
|   | Alan Jackson – Angels and Alcohol || ARIA Highest Selling International Album ||

2017: 7th CMC Music Awards 

The seventh ceremony was held on 23 March 2017 on the Gold Coast with Morgan Evans hosting.

|-
|rowspan="11"| 2017 || Travis Collins || Oz Artist of the Year || 
|-
|   | Travis Collins || Australian Artist of the Year (male) || 
|-
|   | Chelsea Basham || Australian Artist of the Year (female) || 
|-
|   | Fanny Lumsden || New Australian Artist of the Year || 
|-
|   | Travis Collins – "Call Me Crazy" || Video of the Year || 
|-
|   | Keith Urban || International Artist of the Year || 
|-
|   | Keith Urban – "Wasted Time" || International Video of the Year || 
|-
|   | Adam Brand and the Outlaws – Adam Brand and the Outlaws || ARIA Highest Selling Album || 
|-
|   | The McClymonts || Group/Duo of the Year || 
|-
|   | Keith Urban – Ripcord || ARIA Highest Selling International Album || 
|-
|   | Lee Kernaghan || CMC Hall of Fame ||

2018: 8th CMC Music Awards 

The eighth ceremony was held on 15 March 2018 on the Gold Coast with the McClymonts hosting.

|-
|rowspan="8"| 2018 || Adam Brand || Oz Artist of the Year || 
|-
|   | Travis Collins || Australian Artist of the Year (male) || 
|-
|   | Christie Lamb || Australian Artist of the Year (female) || 
|-
|   | Tailgate Drive || New Australian Artist of the Year || 
|-
|   | Adam Brand – "Drunk" || Video of the Year || 
|-
|   | Keith Urban || International Artist of the Year || 
|-
|   | Keith Urban, Carrie Underwood – "The Fighter" || International Video of the Year || 
|-
|   | The McClymonts || Group/Duo of the Year ||

References

Australian music awards